María Antonia Trujillo Rincón (born 18 December 1960) is a Spanish Socialist Workers' Party (PSOE) politician.

Early life and education 
Trujillo was born in Peraleda del Zaucejo, Badajoz. She earned a bachelor's and doctor's degree in law from the University of Extremadura, where she has worked as a professor of Constitutional Law.

Career 
After being counsellor in Juan Carlos Rodríguez Ibarra's cabinet (Junta de Extremadura) from 1999 to 2004, Trujillo was the Minister of Housing during the first part of José Luis Rodríguez Zapatero's legislature (2004–2007).

   
   
 
In 2019, Trujillo moved to Morocco to head the Spanish Ministry of Education in Rabat. She was removed from this position in May 2022.

Ceuta and Melilla controversy 
In September 2022, she was declared “persona non grata” by authorities of the Spanish enclaves of Melilla and Ceuta, barring her from entering the cities, after she supported Morocco's historical claims to the two enclaves, stating that Ceuta and Melilla are "vestiges of the past that interfere in the economic and political independence of this country and in the good relations between the two countries".

Personal life 
Trujillo is divorced and has a child. From 2015 to December 2020, she was romantically involved with a Moroccan man.

References

External links 

 Biografía de María Antonia Trujillo en el sitio web del Ministerio de la Vivienda

1960 births
Living people
People from Campiña Sur (Badajoz)
Spanish Socialist Workers' Party politicians
Members of the 9th Congress of Deputies (Spain)
Politicians from Extremadura
Women government ministers of Spain
21st-century Spanish women politicians
Housing ministers of Spain